Sabanetas (Barrio Sabanetas) is one of the 31 barrios of the municipality of Ponce, Puerto Rico.  Along with Magueyes, Tibes, Portugués, Montes Llanos, Machuelo Arriba, Maragüez, and Cerrillos, Sabanetas is one of the municipality's eight rural interior barrios. The name of this barrio is of native Indian origin. It was founded in 1831.

Location
Sabanetas is located in the southern section of the municipality, east of the traditional city center at Plaza Las Delicias. The toponymy, or origin of the name, is one that describes an open valley covered by grasslands and few, if any, trees.

Boundaries
It is bounded on the North by barrio Cerrillos, in the South by barrios Bucaná and Vayas, in the West by barrios Machuelo Abajo and San Anton, and in the East by barrios Coto Laurel and Vayas.

Features and demographics
In 2000, the population of Sabanetas was 6,420. The population density in Sabanetas was 2,352 persons per square mile.

In 2010, the population of Sabanetas was 5,534 persons, and it had a density of 2,034.6 persons per square mile.

The communities of Campo Alegre, Alta Vista, Villa Flores, and Sabanetas proper are located in barrio Sabanetas.

Major roads serving Barrio Sabanetas are PR-1, PR-52, and PR-10.

The highest point in Barrio Sabanetas is Cerro Los Negrones which stands at 397 feet.

Landmarks
The Sabanetas Industrial Park is located in Sabanetas, as is Central Mercedita.

See also

 List of communities in Puerto Rico

References

External links

Barrio Sabanetas
1831 establishments in Puerto Rico